Mantas Kuklys (born 10 June 1987) is a Lithuanian footballer who plays for Žalgiris and the Lithuania national football team as a midfielder.

Professional career
He started his professional career at FK Šiauliai (Šiauliai Club). On 26 November 2010 he moved to the K.V. Turnhout. 2012 Signed a contract with Vilnius "Žalgiris". On 17 January 2018 Mantas Kuklys signed for Kazakh side FC Zhetysu. In 2021 returned to FK Žalgiris.

On 2023 season belonged to FA Šiauliai (Šiauliai Academy).

References

1987 births
Living people
Lithuanian footballers
Association football midfielders
Lithuania international footballers
FC Šiauliai players
KFC Turnhout players
FK Žalgiris players
Bohemians 1905 players
FC Zhetysu players
A Lyga players
Challenger Pro League players
Czech First League players
Kazakhstan Premier League players
Lithuanian expatriate footballers
Expatriate footballers in Belgium
Lithuanian expatriate sportspeople in Belgium
Expatriate footballers in the Czech Republic
Lithuanian expatriate sportspeople in the Czech Republic
Expatriate footballers in Kazakhstan
Lithuanian expatriate sportspeople in Kazakhstan